Solid-state NMR (ssNMR) spectroscopy is a technique for characterizing atomic level structure in solid materials e.g. powders, single crystals and amorphous samples and tissues using nuclear magnetic resonance (NMR) spectroscopy. The anisotropic part of many spin interactions are present in solid-state NMR, unlike in solution-state NMR where rapid tumbling motion averages out many of the spin interactions. As a result, solid-state NMR spectra are characterised by larger linewidths than in solution state NMR, which can be utilized to give quantitative information on the molecular structure, conformation and dynamics of the material. Solid-state NMR is often combined with magic angle spinning to remove anisotropic interactions and improve the resolution as well as the sensitivity of the technique.

Nuclear spin interactions
The resonance frequency of a nuclear spin depends on the strength of the magnetic field at the nucleus, which can be modified by isotropic (e.g. chemical shift, isotropic J-coupling) and anisotropic interactions (e.g. chemical shift anisotropy, dipolar interactions). In a classical liquid-state NMR experiment, molecular tumbling coming from Brownian motion averages anisotropic interactions to zero and they are therefore not reflected in the NMR spectrum. However, in media with no or little mobility (e.g. crystalline powders, glasses, large membrane vesicles, molecular aggregates), anisotropic local fields or interactions have substantial influence on the behaviour of nuclear spins, which results in the line broadening of the NMR spectra.

Chemical shielding

Chemical shielding is a local property of each nuclear site in a molecule or compound, and is proportional to the applied external magnetic field. The external magnetic field induces currents of the electrons in molecular orbitals. These induced currents create local magnetic fields that lead to characteristic changes in resonance frequency. These changes can be predicted from molecular structure using empirical rules or quantum-chemical calculations.

In general, the chemical shielding is anisotropic because of the anisotropic distribution of molecular orbitals around the nuclear sites. Under sufficiently fast magic angle spinning, or under the effect of molecular tumbling in solution-state NMR, the anisotropic dependence of the chemical shielding is time-averaged to zero, leaving only the isotropic chemical shift.

Dipolar coupling

Nuclear spins exhibit a magnetic dipole moment, which generates a magnetic field that interacts with the dipole moments of other nuclei (dipolar coupling). The magnitude of the interaction is dependent on the gyromagnetic ratio of the spin species, the internuclear distance r, and the orientation, with respect to the external magnetic field B, of the vector connecting the two nuclear spins (see figure). The maximum dipolar coupling is given by the dipolar coupling constant d,

 ,

In a strong magnetic field, the dipolar coupling depends on the angle θ between the internuclear vector and the external magnetic field B (figure) according to
 .

Consequently, two nuclei with a dipolar coupling vector at an angle of θm = 54.7° to a strong external magnetic field have zero dipolar coupling. θm is called the magic angle. Magic angle spinning is typically used to remove dipolar couplings weaker than the spinning rate.

Quadrupolar interaction
Nuclei with a spin quantum number >1/2 have a non-spherical charge distribution and an associated electric quadrupole moment tensor. The nuclear electric quadrupole moment couples with surrounding electric field gradients. The nuclear quadrupole coupling is one of the largest interactions in NMR spectroscopy, often comparable in size to the Zeeman coupling. When the nuclear quadrupole coupling is not negligible relative to the Zeeman coupling, higher order corrections are needed to describe the NMR spectrum correctly. In such cases, the first-order correction to the NMR transition frequency leads to a strong anisotropic line broadening of the NMR spectrum. The second-order frequency contribution depends on the P4 Legendre polynomial, which has zero points at 30.6° and 70.1°. These anisotropic broadenings can be removed using DOR (DOuble angle Rotation) where you spin at two angles at the same time, or DAS (Double Angle Spinning) where you switch quickly between the two angles. Both techniques were developed in the late 1980s, and require specialized hardware (probe). Multiple quantum magic angle spinning (MQMAS) NMR was developed in 1995 and has become a routine method for obtaining high resolution solid-state NMR spectra of quadrupolar nuclei. A similar method to MQMAS is satellite transition magic angle spinning (STMAS) NMR developed in 2000.

J-coupling
The J-coupling or indirect nuclear spin-spin coupling (sometimes also called "scalar" coupling despite the fact that J is a tensor quantity) describes the interaction of nuclear spins through chemical bonds. J-couplings are not always resolved in solids owing to the typically large linewdiths observed in solid state NMR.

Other interactions
Paramagnetic substances are subject to the Knight shift.

Solid-state NMR line shapes

Powder pattern

A powder pattern arises in powdered samples where crystallites are randomly oriented relative to the magnetic field so that all molecular orientations are present. In presence of a chemical shift anisotropy interaction, each orientation with respect to the magnetic field gives a different resonance frequency. If enough crystallites are present, all the different contributions overlap continuously and lead to a smooth spectrum.

Fitting of the pattern in a static ssNMR experiment gives information about the shielding tensor, which are often described by the isotropic chemical shift , the chemical shift anisotropy parameter , and the asymmetry parameter .

Dipolar pattern 

The dipolar powder pattern (also Pake pattern) has a very characteristic shape that arises when two nuclear spins are coupled together within a crystallite. The splitting between the maxima (the "horns") of the pattern is equal to the dipolar coupling constant .:

Essential solid-state techniques

Magic angle spinning

Magic angle spinning (MAS) is a technique routinely used in solid-state NMR to produce narrower NMR and more intense NMR lines. This is achieved by rotating the sample at the magic angle θm (ca. 54.74°, where cos2θm=1/3) with respect to the direction of the magnetic field, which has the effect to cancel, at least partially, anisotropic nuclear interactions such as dipolar, chemical shift anisotropy, and quadrupolar interactions. To achieve the complete averaging of these interactions, the sample needs to be spun at a rate that is at least higher than the greater that the largest anisotropy.

Spinning a powder sample at a slower rate than the largest component of the chemical shift anisotropy results in an incomplete averaging of the interaction, and produces a set of spinning sidebands in addition to the isotropic line, centred at the isotropic chemical shift. Spinning sidebands are sharp lines separated from the isotropic frequency by a multiple of the spinning rate. Although spinning sidebands can be used to measure anisotropic interactions, they are often undesirable and removed by spinning the sample faster or by recording the data points synchronously with the rotor period.

Cross-polarisation 

Cross-polarization (CP) if a fundamental RF pulse sequence and a building-block in many solid-state NMR. It is typically used to enhance the signal of a dilute nuclei with a low gyromagnetic ratio (e.g.) by magnetization transfer from an abundant nuclei with a high gyromagnetic ratio (e.g. ), or as a spectral editing method to get through space information (e.g. directed → CP in protein spectroscopy).

To establish magnetization transfer, RF pulses ("contact pulses") are simultaneously applied on both frequency channels to produce  fields whose strength fulfil the Hartmann–Hahn condition:

In practice, the pulse power, as well as the length of the contact pulse are experimentally optimised. The power of one contact pulse is typically ramped to achieve a more broadband and efficient magnetisation transfer.

Decoupling
Spin interactions can be removed (decoupled) to increase the resolution of NMR spectra during the detection, or to extend the lifetime of the nuclear magnetization.

Heteronuclear decoupling is achieved by radio-frequency irradiation on at the frequency of the nucleus to be decoupled, which is often 1H. The irradiation can be continuous (continuous wave decoupling), or a series of pulses that extend the performance and the bandwidth of the decoupling (TPPM, SPINAL-64, SWf-TPPM)

Homonuclear decoupling is achieved with multiple-pulse sequences (WAHUHA, MREV-8, BR-24, BLEW-12, FSLG), or continuous wave modulation (DUMBO, eDUMBO). Dipolar interactions can also be removed with magic angle spinning. Ultra fast MAS (from 60 kHz up to above 111 kHz) is an efficient way to average all dipolar interactions, including 1H-1H homonuclear dipolar interactions, which extends the resolution of 1H spectra and enables the usage of pulse sequences used in solution state NMR.

Advanced solid-state NMR spectroscopy

Rotational Echo DOuble Resonance (REDOR) 

Rotational Echo DOuble Resonance (REDOR) experiment,  are a type of heteronuclear dipolar recoupling experiment which enable one to re-introduce heteronuclear dipolar couplings averaged by MAS.  The reintroduction of such dipolar coupling reduce the intensity of the NMR signal intensity compared to a reference spectrum where no dephasing pulse is used.  REDOR can be used to measure heteronuclear distances, and are the basis of NMR crystallographic studies.

Ultra Fast MAS for 1H NMR 

The strong 1H-1H homonuclear dipolar interactions associated with broad NMR lines and short T2 relaxation time effectively relegate proton for bimolecular NMR. Recent developments of faster MAS, and reduction of dipolar interactions by deuteration have made proton ssNMR as versatile as in solution. This includes spectral dispersion in multi-dimensional experiments as well as structurally valuable restraints and parameters important for studying material dynamics.

Ultra-fast NMR and the associated sharpening of the NMR lines enables NMR pulse sequences to capitalize on proton-detection to improve the sensitivity of the experiments compared to the direct detection of a spin-1/2 system (X). Such enhancement factor  is given by:

where  are the gyromagnetic ratios,  represent the NMR line widths, and  represent the quality factor of the probe resonances.

MAS-Dynamic Nuclear Polarisation (MAS-DNP) 

Magic angle spinning Dynamic Nuclear Polarization (MAS-DNP) is a technique that increases the sensitivity of NMR experiments by several orders of magnitude. It involves the transfer of the very high electron polarisation from unpaired electrons to nearby nuclei. This is achieved at cryogenic temperatures by the means of a continuous microwave irradiation coming from a klystron or a Gyrotron, with a frequency close to the corresponding electron paramagnetic resonance (EPR) frequency.

The development in the MAS-DNP instrumentation, as well as the improvement of polarising agents (TOTAPOL, AMUPOL, TEKPOL, etc.) to achieve a more efficient transfer of polarisation has dramatically reduced experiments times which enabled the observation of surfaces, insensitive isotopes, and multidimensional experiments on low natural abundance nuclei, and diluted species.

Applications

Biology
Solid-state NMR is used to study insoluble proteins and proteins very sensitive to their environment such as membrane proteins and amyloid fibrils,. The latter topic relates to protein aggregation diseases such as Alzheimer's disease and Parkinson's disease. Solid-state NMR spectroscopy complements solution-state NMR spectroscopy and beam diffraction methods (e.g. X-ray crystallography, electron microscopy). Despite often requiring isotopic enrichment, ssNMR has the advantage that little sample preparation is required and can be used on not just dry or frozen samples, but also fully hydrated samples or native non-crystalline tissues. Solid-state NMR structure elucidation of proteins has traditionally been based on secondary chemical shifts and spatial contacts between nuclei. 

Solid-state NMR has also been successfully used to study biomaterials such as bone, hair, silk, wood, as well as viruses, plants, cells, biopsies, and even live animals.

Materials science
Solid-state NMR spectroscopy serves as an analysis tool in organic and inorganic chemistry, where it is used to characterize chemical composition, supramolecular structure, local motions, kinetics, and thermodynamics, with the special ability to assign the observed behavior to specific sites in a molecule.

Solid-state NMR has been successfully used to study metal organic frameworks (MOFS), batteries, surfaces of nanoporous materials, polymers.

Art conservation 
NMR can also be applied to art conservation. Different salts and moisture levels can be detected through the use of solid state NMR. However, sampling sizes retrieved from works of art in order to run through these large conducting magnets typically exceed levels deemed acceptable. Unilateral NMR techniques use portable magnets that are applied to the object of interest, bypassing the need for sampling.

References

Suggested readings for beginners

General NMR

Solid-state NMR 
 
 
Levitt, Malcolm H., Spin Dynamics: Basics of Nuclear Magnetic Resonance, Wiley, Chichester, United Kingdom, 2001.  (NMR basics, including solids)
 Duer, Melinda J., Introduction to Solid-State NMR Spectroscopy, Blackwell, Oxford, 2004. (Some detailed examples of ssNMR spectroscopy)
Schmidt-Rohr, K. and Spiess, H.-W., Multidimensional Solid-State NMR and Polymers, Academic Press, San Diego, 1994.

External links
 SSNMRBLOG Solid-State NMR Literature Blog by Prof. Rob Schurko's Solid-State NMR group at the University of Windsor
  
  

Nuclear magnetic resonance
Scientific techniques